The University of Illinois Conservatory and Plant Collection is a  conservatory and botanical garden located in the Plant Sciences Laboratory Greenhouses, on the University of Illinois at Urbana–Champaign campus, 1201 South Dorner Drive, Urbana, Illinois. The conservatory is generally open to the public daily when the university is in session, though it may be closed for classes, research, or special events.

The conservatory houses over 200 species and 60 families of tropical and subtropical plants selected for their botanical interest or economic importance. Separate greenhouses contain ferns, bromeliads, cycads, orchids, carnivorous plants, herb and spice plants, and cacti, euphorbia, and other succulents. There is also an outdoor butterfly garden.

Plants of special interest include Brighamia insignis, Lebronnecia kokioides, and Sauromatum venosum.

See also 
 List of botanical gardens in the United States
 David Gottlieb

References

External links 
 University of Illinois Conservatory and Plant Collection

Botanical gardens in Illinois
Conservatory and Plant Collection
Tourist attractions in Champaign County, Illinois
Greenhouses in Illinois